Krishi Jagran is a magazine dedicated exclusively to agriculture. It is published in 12 Indian regional languages - Hindi, Punjabi, Gujarati, Marathi, Kannada, Telugu, Bengali, Assamese, Odia, Tamil, Malayalam and English . In English it is published as Agriculture World.  The magazine was founded by Mr. M.C Dominic on September 5th, 1996  in New Delhi.

Awards

 
Krishi Jagran has gained a place in the Limca Book of Records for the largest multilingual agri-rural magazine , which is published in 12 languages in the country with a combined readership of nearly ten million.

References

Agricultural magazines
Multilingual magazines